Glen Elder is a city in Mitchell County, Kansas, United States.  As of the 2020 census, the population of the city was 362.

History
Glen Elder was originally known as West Hampton, and under the latter name was laid out and platted in 1871 by promoters who built a large gristmill at the site. The town later adopted the name Glen Elder when the post office of that name was moved there from its former location a half mile north. The present name is after a grove of box elder trees. Glen Elder incorporated in 1879.

Geography
Glen Elder is located at  (39.499714, -98.307509).

Climate

Demographics

2010 census
As of the census of 2010, there were 445 people, 193 households, and 129 families residing in the city. The racial makeup of the city was 96.9% White, 0.4% African American, 0.9% Native American, 0.9% Asian, and 0.9% from two or more races. Hispanic or Latino of any race were 2.0% of the population.

There were 193 households, of which 30.6% had children under the age of 18 living with them, 56.0% were married couples living together, 5.2% had a female householder with no husband present, 5.7% had a male householder with no wife present, and 33.2% were non-families. 31.6% of all households were made up of individuals, and 19.2% had someone living alone who was 65 years of age or older. The average household size was 2.31 and the average family size was 2.84.

The median age in the city was 41.2 years. 27% of residents were under the age of 18; 5.8% were between the ages of 18 and 24; 22% were from 25 to 44; 26.5% were from 45 to 64; and 18.7% were 65 years of age or older. The gender makeup of the city was 50.1% male and 49.9% female.

2000 census
As of the census of 2000, there were 439 people, 196 households, and 130 families residing in the city. The racial makeup of the city was 96.81% White, 0.68% African American, 0.68% Native American, 0.46% Asian, 0.46% from other races, and 0.91% from two or more races. Hispanic or Latino of any race were 1.14% of the population.

There were 196 households, out of which 28.1% had children under the age of 18 living with them, 56.1% were married couples living together, 9.2% had a female householder with no husband present, and 33.2% were non-families. 27.6% of all households were made up of individuals, and 18.4% had someone living alone who was 65 years of age or older. The average household size was 2.24 and the average family size was 2.75.

In the city, the population was spread out, with 22.8% under the age of 18, 8.0% from 18 to 24, 20.5% from 25 to 44, 23.0% from 45 to 64, and 25.7% who were 65 years of age or older. The median age was 44 years. For every 100 females, there were 97.7 males. For every 100 females age 18 and over, there were 93.7 males.

The median income for a household in the city was $26,000, and the median income for a family was $32,361. Males had a median income of $21,528 versus $18,125 for females. The per capita income for the city was $20,169. About 5.4% of families and 9.9% of the population were below the poverty line, including 10.2% of those under age 18 and 10.0% of those age 65 or over.

Parks and Recreation
 Waconda Lake and Glen Elder State Park.

Education
The community is served by Waconda USD 272 public school district.  The district elementary school is Lakeside Elementary School in Cawker City. The district high school is Lakeside High School in Downs with the mascot Knights.

School unification combined Cawker City High School with Glen Elder High School in 1971 forming Waconda East High School. The Waconda East High School mascot was Vikings. Waconda East High School was then unified with Downs High School in 2003 forming USD 272.

Glen Elder High School was closed through school unification. The Glen Elder High School mascot was Glen Elder Bearcats.

The district previously operated Glen Elder Elementary School and Glen Elder Junior High School.

References

Further reading

External links
 City of Glen Elder
 Glen Elder - Directory of Public Officials
 Glen Elder city map, KDOT

Cities in Kansas
Cities in Mitchell County, Kansas